The George Few House, located at 208 1st Ave. E. in Flandreau, South Dakota, was built in 1899.  It was listed on the National Register of Historic Places in 1983.

The house cost $6,000 to build.  It was deemed "significant as the home of an early businessman and politician and is a fine example of Eastern Stick style architecture."

References

Houses on the National Register of Historic Places in South Dakota
Queen Anne architecture in South Dakota
Houses completed in 1899
National Register of Historic Places in Moody County, South Dakota
1899 establishments in South Dakota